Chile competed at the 2022 World Athletics Championships in Eugene, Oregon from 15 to 24 July 2022. Chile had entered 6 athletes.

Results

Men
Field events

Women
Field events

References

Chile
World Championships in Athletics
2022